Michael D'Asaro Sr. (March 14, 1938 – December 12, 2000) was an American fencing master and coach.

D'Asaro was a Pan American, U.S., and World Military Sabre Champion, and had the particular distinction of being perhaps the last top-level three-weapon competitor. He was also a fencing coach at San Jose State University.

Accomplishments

Sabre
 1960 Summer Olympics – 4th place US team.
 Pan American Games – 1st in individual and team, 1963.
 Nationals – 1st, 1962, medalist in '60, '66, and '67.
 NCAA – 1st 1960.

Foil
Nationals – 3rd, 1963, 1st (team) 1959.

Épée
Pan American Games – 2nd (individual), 1st (team), 1959.
Martini-Rossi – 3rd, 1963.

Coaching
Olympic Coach and member of the National Coaching Staff: 1976 Olympics, 1977 World University Games, 1975 and '79 Pan American Games, and 1973 and '74 Junior World Championships.

Honors
D'Asaro was inducted into the USFA Hall of Fame in 2002.

He finished his coaching career at Westside Fencing Center in Los Angeles.

Miscellaneous

His former wife, Gay Jacobsen D'Asaro, was a member of the 1976 and 1980 US Women's Olympic Foil Teams.  His son, Michael D'Asaro Jr., coached in California at California Institute of Technology, Santa Barbara Fencing Academy and his soon to open club, Salle D'asaro. Michael Jr. has now relocated to Trophy Club, Texas.  He's also made mention of a new fencing club.

Former students
Jeff Richardson
Darrell Bluhm
Michael D'asaro Jr.
Thom Cate
Soren Thompson, two-time Olympian in epee and world champion

See also
 United States Fencing Association
List of USFA Division I National Champions

References

1938 births
2000 deaths
Fencers at the 1960 Summer Olympics
San Jose State Spartans fencing coaches
American male épée fencers
Pan American Games gold medalists for the United States
Pan American Games silver medalists for the United States
Pan American Games medalists in fencing
Fencers at the 1959 Pan American Games
Fencers at the 1963 Pan American Games
Olympic fencers of the United States
Medalists at the 1959 Pan American Games
Medalists at the 1963 Pan American Games
American male foil fencers
American male sabre fencers